Mannan 1,2-(1,3)-alpha-mannosidase (exo-1,2-1,3-alpha-mannosidase, 1,2-1,3-alpha-D-mannan mannohydrolase) is an enzyme with systematic name (1->2)-(1->3)-alpha-D-mannan mannohydrolase. This enzyme catalyses the following chemical reaction

 Hydrolysis of (1->2)- and (1->3)-linkages in yeast mannan, releasing mannose

A 1,6-alpha-D-mannan backbone remains after action on yeast mannan.

References

External links 
 

EC 3.2.1